Bannerghatta is a 2021 Indian Malayalam-language Mystery thriller film directed by debutant director Vishnu Narayanan and written by Arjun and Gokul. The film stars Karthik Ramakrishnan.

Premise 
Ashiq an acting driver - Protagonist of the movie gets a call from his sister, from Bangalore where she went to attend an interview. From the call, Ashiq came to know that she is being chased by a group of persons from the nearby suburbs.

Cast 
 Karthik Ramakrishnan as Ashiq
 Asha Menon
 Anoop as Police constable
 Sunil as SI
 Vinod as Police constable
 Anoop as Driver

Production 
After starring in Shibu, Karthik Ramakrishnan was cast in the film, directed by debutant Vishnu Narayanan, written by Arjun & Gokul.

Release 
Bannerghatta was released on Amazon Prime Video on 25 July 2021.

Critical Reception
Times of India says "Making a story set in a moving vehicle a compelling watch is hardly easy. Director Vishnu Narayanan’s film Banerghatta gets unfurled mostly in its protagonist’s journey in the night, as constant phone calls and other interruptions disrupt things for him, The movie might excite those who like to give unconventional story-telling a try". Subash K Jha of Spotboye says "This Kartik Ramakrishnan Starrer Is A Wild Untameable Beast Of A Film" and gave 3 out of 5 stars.

References

External links
 

2021 films
2021 crime thriller films
Indian crime thriller films
2020s Malayalam-language films
Amazon Prime Video original films